The 2019–20 season was the 29th season of competitive association football in Ukraine since dissolution of the Soviet Union.

National teams

Ukraine national football team

Results and fixtures

2020 UEFA Euro

Ukraine U-21 national football team

2021 UEFA European Under-21 Championship

2021 UEFA European Under-21 Championship qualification

Group 8

Ukraine U-19 national football team

2020 UEFA European Under-19 Championship

2020 UEFA European Under-19 Championship qualification

Group 9

Ukraine women's national football team

Results and fixtures

Friendlies

2021 UEFA Women's Euro qualifying

Group I

Ukraine women's national under-20 football team

Ukraine women's national under-17 football team

UEFA competitions

UEFA Champions League

Qualifying phase and play-off round

Third qualifying round

Group C

UEFA Europa League

Second qualifying round

Third qualifying round

Play-off round

Group stage

Group B

Group I

Knockout phase

Round of 32

Round of 16

Quarter-finals

Semi-finals

UEFA Youth League

UEFA Champions League Path

Group C

Domestic Champions Path

First round

Second round

Play-offs

UEFA Women's Champions League

Qualifying round

Group 4

Men's club football

Note: For all scratched clubs, see section Clubs removed for more details

Premier League

First stage table

Championship round table

Relegation round table

Play-offs for qualification to the UEFA Europa League

PFL League 1 (First League)

PFL League 2 (Second League)

Group A

Group B

Championship game

Cup competitions

Ukrainian Cup

Main bracket

Final

Super Cup

Women's club football

Note: For all scratched clubs, see section Clubs removed for more details

Higher League

Managerial changes 
This is a list of managerial changes among Ukrainian professional football clubs (top two leagues):

Clubs removed
 Arsenal–Kyiv withdrew from professional competitions after being relegated from the Premier League.
 PFC Sumy received new ownership during winter break in the face of Serhiy Vashchenko who earlier this season was supposed to become the owner of Kobra Kharkiv. The new head coach of the Sumy club who had been announced was also former head coach of Kobra, Oleksandr Oliynyk. At the same time according to the former club's director Anatoliy Boiko, on 1 December 2018 PFC Sumy did not have any players on contract. On 11 April 2019, the FFU Control and Disciplinary Committee adopted its decision to strip the club of professional status and exclude the club from any competitions that it is participating currently or in the future. However the club has a right to file an appeal. Additional separate sanctions were to be also applied against the club's playing and administrative personnel. On 14 April 2019, the chairman of the FFU committee of ethics and fair play Francesco Baranka noted in regards to additional sanctions that PFC Sumy has earned some 10 million euros in match fixing. More to it, Ukrainian coach Oleksandr Sevidov who held post of head coach consultant in PFC Sumy and previously managed FC Illichivets Mariupol received a lifetime disqualification.
 On 17 February 2019, president of FC Zirka Kropyvnytskyi commented on his club's withdrawal from further participation in competitions of the Ukrainian First League. The president accused the newly formed NABU and law enforcement authorities in pressure against him. The president of the league expressed his surprise claiming that there seemed no real reason why the club had to withdraw. On 5 April 2019, the PFL council of leagues adopted its decision to remove FC Zirka Kropyvnytskyi from the League as it officially withdrew on 14 March 2019. On 22 April 2019, the club's vice-president announced that the club will restart from regional competitions with intention to return the club's pro-status in the future.
 Helios Kharkiv, the club reorganized under new management under a new name as FC Kobra Kharkiv. The club merged with another amateur club called the Kobra Football Academy which was playing in the Kharkiv Oblast Football Championship. On 15 August 2018 the club informed the Professional Football League of Ukraine about withdrawal from professional competitions, and were later officially expelled from the league.
 FC Myr Hornostayivka withdrew from competitions in protest.
 Zlahoda-Dnipro-1 
 WFC Lviv

Notes

References

 
Seasons in Ukrainian football
2019 sport-related lists
2020 sport-related lists